The 1937 Howard Bulldogs football team was an American football team that represented Howard College (now known as the Samford University) as a member of the Dixie Conference during the 1937 college football season. In their third year under head coach Billy Bancroft, the team compiled a 5–3 record.

Schedule

References

Howard
Samford Bulldogs football seasons
Howard Bulldogs football